John Edward Cohill (December 13, 1907–June 13, 1994) was an American clergyman and bishop for the Roman Catholic Diocese of Goroka in Papua New Guinea. He was born in Elizabeth, New Jersey in 1907. Cohill was ordained to the priesthood in 1936. He was appointed bishop in 1966. He died in 1994.

References 

1907 births
1994 deaths
American Roman Catholic bishops by contiguous area of the United States
People from Elizabeth, New Jersey
Roman Catholic bishops of Goroka
20th-century American clergy